Luleå Hockey/MSSK is a professional ice hockey team in the Swedish Women's Hockey League (SDHL), the top-tier of women's ice hockey in Sweden. They play in Luleå, a port city in northern Sweden, at the Coop Norrbotten Arena. The team is the most successful club in SDHL history, having been regular season champions for four consecutive years, 2015–2019, and winning the Swedish Championship five times in seven years, 2016 to 2022.

History 
The team was formed in 2015, after a merger between Luleå HF and Munksund Skuthamn SK (MSSK). In October 2016, the club set an SDHL attendance record with 3,150 spectators for a match against Norrland rivals Modo Hockey.

After winning the Swedish Championship in 2018, they played against that year's Isobel Cup winners, the Metropolitan Riveters of the National Women's Hockey League (NWHL), in the first-ever Champions Cup of women's ice hockey. Luleå won the match 4-2. In November that year, the club again set a new record for SDHL attendance, with 6,220 spectators for a match against AIK IF.

In 2019, the club hired Mikael Forsberg to replace Fredrik Glader, who had served as head coach for the first four seasons of the club's existence.

Season-by-season results 
This is a list of all seasons completed by Luleå Hockey/MSSK, since the team was founded in 2015. Code explanation: GP—Games played, W—Wins, OTW—Overtime wins, T—Overtime losses, L—Losses, GF—Goals for, GA—Goals against, Pts—Points. Top Scorer: Points (Goals+Assists)

Players and personnel

2022–23 roster 

}

Coaching staff and team personnel
 Head coach: Mikael Forsberg 
 Assistant coach: Oskar Häggström
 Physical therapist: Johanna Olofsson
 Equipment manager: Carina Marnéus

Team captains 
 Emma Eliasson, 2015–2017
 Jenni Hiirikoski, 2017–present

Head coaches 
 Lisa Flemström, 2013–14
 Oskar Häggström, 2014–15
 Fredrik Glader, 2015–2019
 Mikael Forsberg, 2019–present

Franchise records and leaders

Regular season
Most goals in a season: Michelle Karvinen, 37 (2015–16)
Most assists in a season: Jenni Hiirikoski, 44 (2018–19)
Most points in a season: Michelle Karvinen, 79 (2015–16)
Most points in a season, defenseman: Jenni Hiirikoski, 63 (2018–19)

Best save percentage in a season, over ten games played: Sara Grahn, .932 (2018–19) 
Best goals against average in a season, over ten games played: Maria Omberg, 1.65 (2015–16 & 2017–18)

Career
Most shutouts in a career: Maria Omberg, 25
Most penalty minutes in a career: Ronja Savolainen, 149

Scoring leaders
The top-ten point-scorers (goals + assists) of Luleå Hockey/MSSK through the 2021–22 season.

Note: Pos = Position; GP = Games played; G = Goals; A = Assists; Pts = Points; P/G = Points per game;  = 2022–23 Luleå Hockey/MSSK player

References

External links 
 Team information and statistics from Eliteprospects.com and Eurohockey.com and Hockeyarchives.info 

Ice hockey teams in Sweden
Swedish Women's Hockey League teams
Women's ice hockey teams in Europe
Women's ice hockey in Sweden
Ice hockey teams in Norrbotten County